A by-election was held for the New South Wales Legislative Assembly electorate of Hunter on 25 April 1860 because of the resignation of Richard Jones.

Dates

Result

Richard Jones resigned.

See also
Electoral results for the district of Hunter
List of New South Wales state by-elections

References

1860 elections in Australia
New South Wales state by-elections
1860s in New South Wales